Megalania  (Varanus priscus) is an extinct species of giant monitor lizard, part of the megafaunal assemblage that inhabited Australia during the Pleistocene.

Megalania is thought to have had a similar ecology to the living Komodo dragon (Varanus komodoensis). The youngest fossil remains of giant monitor lizards in Australia date to around 50,000 years ago. The first indigenous settlers of Australia might have encountered megalania, and been a factor in megalania's extinction. While originally megalania was considered to be the only member of the titular genus "Megalania", today it is considered a member of the genus Varanus, being closely related to other Australian monitor lizards.

Taxonomy
 
Sir Richard Owen described the first known remains of megalania in 1859, from three vertebrae amongst a collection of primarily marsupial bones purchased by the British Museum, collected from the bed of a tributary of the Condamine River, west of Moreton Bay in eastern Australia. The name "Megalania prisca" was coined in the paper by Owen to mean "ancient great roamer"; the name was chosen "in reference to the terrestrial nature of the great Saurian". Owen used a modification of the Greek word ἠλαίνω ēlainō ("I roam"). The close similarity to the Latin word: lania (feminine form of "butcher") has resulted in numerous taxonomic and popular descriptions of "Megalania" mistranslating the name as "ancient giant butcher." "Megalania" is no longer consider a valid genus, with many authors preferring to consider it a junior synonym of Varanus, which encompasses all living monitor lizards. As the genera "Megalania" and Varanus are respectively feminine and masculine in gender, the specific names agree: prisca (feminine) and priscus (masculine).

Megalania is included within Varanus because its morphology suggests that it is more closely related to some species of Varanus than others, so excluding V. priscus from Varanus renders the latter genus an unnatural grouping. Ralph Molnar noted in 2004 that, even if every species of the genus Varanus were divided into groups currently designated as subgenera, V. priscus would still be classified in the genus Varanus, because this is the current subgenus name, as well as genus name, for all Australian monitors. Unless other Australian monitor species were each also classified their own exclusive genera, "Megalania" would not be a valid genus name. However, Molnar noted that "megalania" is suitable for use as a vernacular, rather than scientific name, for the species Varanus priscus.

Phylogeny

Several studies have attempted to establish the phylogenetic position of megalania within the Varanidae. An affinity with the perentie (Varanus giganteus), Australia's largest living lizard, has been suggested based on skull-roof morphology. The most recent comprehensive study proposes a sister-taxon relationship with the large Komodo dragon (Varanus komodoensis) based on neurocranial similarities, with the lace monitor (Varanus varius) as the closest living Australian relative. Conversely, the perentie is considered more closely related to Gould's monitor and the Argus monitor.

Size

The lack of complete or nearly complete fossil skeletons has made it difficult to determine the exact dimensions of megalania.

In a book published in 2004, Ralph Molnar determined a range of potential sizes for megalania, made by scaling up from dorsal vertebrae, after he determined a relationship between dorsal vertebrae width and total body length.

Palaeobiology

Megalania is the largest terrestrial lizard known to have existed. Judging from its size, it would have fed mostly upon medium- to large-sized animals, including any of the giant marsupials such as Diprotodon, along with other reptiles and small mammals, as well as birds and their eggs and chicks. It had heavily built limbs and body, a large skull complete with a small crest between the eyes, and a jaw full of serrated, blade-like teeth.

Some scientists regard with skepticism the contention that megalania was the only, or even principal, predator of the Australian Pleistocene megafauna. They note that the marsupial lion (Thylacoleo carnifex) has been implicated with the butchery of very large Pleistocene mammals, while  megalania has not. In addition, they note that megalania fossils are extremely uncommon, in contrast to T. carnifex's wide distribution across Australian Pleistocene deposits. Quinkana, a genus of terrestrial crocodiles that grew up to 6 m and was present until around 40,000 years ago, has also been marked as another apex predator of Australian megafauna.

If one were to reconstruct the ecosystems that existed before the arrival of the humans on Australia, reintroducing Komodo dragons (megalania's closest relative) has been suggested.

This speed is comparable to that of the extant freshwater crocodile (Crocodylus johnstoni).

The scales of megalania would possibly be similar to those of their extant relatives, possessing a honeycomb microstructure and both durable and resilient to water evaporation.

Venom
 
Along with other varanid lizards, such as the Komodo dragon and the Nile monitor, megalania belongs to the proposed clade Toxicofera, which contains all known reptile clades possessing toxin-secreting oral glands, as well as their close venomous and nonvenomous relatives, including Iguania, Anguimorpha, and snakes. Closely related varanids use a potent venom found in glands inside the jaw. The venom in these lizards have been shown to be a haemotoxin. The venom would act as an anticoagulant and would greatly increase the bleeding the prey received from its wounds. This would rapidly decrease the prey's blood pressure and lead to systemic shock. Being a member of Anguimorpha, megalania may have been venomous and if so, would be the largest venomous vertebrate known.

Extinction 
The youngest remains of the species date to the Late Pleistocene, with the youngest remains possibly referrable to the species being a large osteoderm dating to approximately 50,000 years ago from the Mount Etna Caves National Park in central-eastern Queensland. A study examined the morphology of nine closely related extant varanid lizards and then allometrically scaled and compared them to V. priscus, found that the musculature of the limbs, posture, muscular mass, and possible muscular composition of the animal would most likely have been inefficient when attempting to outrun the early human settlers who colonised Australia during that time.

Confrontations between megalania and early Aboriginal Australians may have inspired tales of fearsome creatures such as the whowie.

References

Pleistocene reptiles of Australia
Quaternary lizards
Pleistocene first appearances
Taxa named by Richard Owen
Fossil taxa described in 1859
Monitor lizards of Australia
Apex predators